Zhaojiagang Township is a rural township in Cili County, Hunan Province, People's Republic of China.

Administrative division
The township is divided into 19 villages, the following areas: Shuanghe Village, Heping Village, Chang'an Village, Xinhe Village, Xinping Village, Dayong Village, Guangya Village, Yuping Village, Tian'e Village, Mashan Village, Zhumugang Village, Jinping Village, Xinquan Village, Xinzhuang Village, Xin'an Village, Wantian Village, Xinqiao Village, Tianshan Village, and Xinyu Village (双河村、和坪村、长安村、新合村、新坪村、大庸村、广垭村、于坪村、天娥村、麻山村、株木岗村、金坪村、新泉村、新庄村、新安村、碗田村、新桥村、天山村、新峪村).

References

Divisions of Cili County
Ethnic townships of the People's Republic of China